Sempé is a French surname. Notable people with the surname include:

Gabriel Sempé (1901–1990), French athlete
Inga Sempé (born 1968), French designer and constructor of technical items
Jean-Jacques Sempé (1932–2022), French cartoonist
Skip Sempé (born 1958), American harpsichordist and conductor